María Elisa Rivera y León de Díaz (born 1887 in Hatillo, Puerto Rico) was one of the first four women from Puerto Rico to earn a medical degree; the other three were Ana Janer in 1909, Palmira Gatell in 1910, and Dolores Piñero in 1913. Ana Janer and Rivera graduated in the same medical school class in 1909 and thus could both be considered the first female Puerto Rican physician.

Rivera graduated from the Women's Medical College of Baltimore, and started her medical practice that same year. She was the first Puerto Rican woman to graduate medical school with the highest honors.

See also

List of Puerto Ricans
History of women in Puerto Rico

References

1887 births
People from Arecibo, Puerto Rico
Puerto Rican physicians
Puerto Rican women physicians
Year of death missing